Riley Edgar Biggs (March 24, 1900 – November 24, 1971) was a National Football League center who played two seasons with the New York Giants. He played college football at Baylor University and attended Southampton High School in Southampton, New York. He was also a member of the Rock Island Independents of the American Football League.

References

External links
Just Sports Stats

1900 births
1971 deaths
Players of American football from Texas
American football centers
Baylor Bears football players
Rock Island Independents players
New York Giants players
People from Montgomery County, Texas